Reginald Roydon Phillips (9 March 1921 – 1972) was a Welsh professional footballer who played as a forward for  Shrewsbury Town and Crewe Alexandra.

References

1921 births
1972 deaths
Footballers from Llanelli
Welsh footballers
Association football forwards
Shrewsbury Town F.C. players
Crewe Alexandra F.C. players
English Football League players